This list of the prehistoric life of Alaska contains the various prehistoric life-forms whose fossilized remains have been reported from within the US state of Alaska.

Precambrian
The Paleobiology Database records no known occurrences of Precambrian fossils in Alaska.

Paleozoic

Selected Paleozoic taxa of Alaska

 †Abadehella
 †Acanthophyllum
  †Acanthopyge
 †Acmarhachis
 †Agoniatites – tentative report
 †Amplexus
 †Ancyrognathus
 †Anomphalus – tentative report
 †Athyris
 †Athyris lamellosa – or unidentified related form
  †Atrypa
 †Atrypa reticularis
 †Aulopora
  †Aviculopecten
 †Aviculopecten chesterensis – tentative report
 †Aviculopecten delawarensis – or unidentified related form
 †Aviculopecten edwardsi – or unidentified related form
 †Aviculopecten fasciculatus – or unidentified related form
 †Aviculopecten hardinensis – or unidentified related form
 †Aviculopecten mccoyi – or unidentified related form
 †Aviculopecten montpelierensis – or unidentified related form
 †Aviculopecten occidentalis – or unidentified related form
 †Aviculopecten similis – or unidentified related form
 † Avonia – tentative report
 †Bailiaspis
 †Bathyuriscus
 †Belemnites – tentative report
 †Bellerophon
 †Bellerophon chapmani
 †Bellerophon livengoodensis
 †Bellerophon spergensis – or unidentified related form
 †Bembexia – tentative report
 †Bimuria
 †Callograptus
 †Calymene
  †Calymene blumenbachii
 †Calymene iladon
 †Camarotoechia
 †Camarotoechia billingsi – or unidentified comparable form
 †Camarotoechia duplicata – tentative report
 †Camarotoechia winiskensis – or unidentified comparable form
 Capulus
 †Catenipora
 †Catenipora jacovikii – or unidentified comparable form
 †Catenipora robustus – or unidentified comparable form
 †Catenipora rubra – or unidentified comparable form
 †Cedaria
  †Cheirurus
 †Chirognathus – tentative report
 †Chonetes
 †Chonetes capax – or unidentified related form
 †Chonetes illinoisensis – or unidentified related form
 †Chonetes manitobensis – or unidentified comparable form
 †Chonetes timanicus – or unidentified related form
 †Chonetes verneuile – or unidentified comparable form
 †Chonetes verneuilianus – or unidentified related form
 †Christiania
  †Cladochonus
 †Cladospongia – type locality for genus
 †Cleiothyridina
 †Cleiothyridina sublamellosa – or unidentified related form
  †Climacograptus
 †Climacograptus antiquus – or unidentified related form
 †Climacograptus bicornis
 †Climacograptus eximius – or unidentified comparable form
 †Climacograptus hughesi – or unidentified comparable form
 †Climacograptus indivisus
 †Climacograptus innotatus
 †Climacograptus medius
 †Climacograptus minutus – tentative report
 †Climacograptus phyllophorus – or unidentified comparable form
 †Climacograptus pungens
 †Climacograptus rectangularis
 †Climacograptus scalaris
 †Climacograptus stenotelus
 †Climacograptus trifilis
 †Coenites
  †Composita
 †Composita ambigua – or unidentified comparable form
 †Composita bellula – or unidentified related form
 †Conchidium
 †Conocardium
 †Cordylodus – tentative report
 †Crania
 †Craticula – report made of unidentified related form or using admittedly obsolete nomenclature
 †Cyclonema
  †Cyclopteris – tentative report
 †Cymbidium
 †Cyphaspis
 †Cypricardinia
  †Cyrtoceras
 †Cyrtospirifer
 †Cyrtospirifer buddingtoni – type locality for species
 †Cyrtospirifer paridaensis
 †Cystodictya
 †Cystodictya lineata – or unidentified related form
 †Cystodictya pustulosa – or unidentified related form
 †Dalmanites
 †Dendrograptus
 †Dentalium
 †Dentalium hecetaensis
 †Dicoelosia
 †Dictyonema
  †Didymograptus
 †Didymograptus extensus – or unidentified comparable form
 †Didymograptus nitidus – or unidentified comparable form
 †Didymograptus sagitticaulis
 †Didymograptus serratulus
  †Diplograptus
 †Diplograptus cyperoides – or unidentified comparable form
 †Diplograptus elongatus
 †Diplograptus euglyptus
 †Diplograptus hughesi
 †Diplograptus inutilis
 †Diplograptus modestus
 †Diplograptus mucroterminatus
 †Diplograptus multidens – or unidentified related form
 †Diplograptus nicolsoni – or unidentified comparable form
 †Diplopora – tentative report
 †Drepanophycus
 †Edmondia
 † Ella – tentative report
 †Ellesmeroceras
 †Elrathia
 †Emmonsia
 †Eospirifer
 †Epiphyton
  †Euomphalus
 †Euomphalus brooksensis
 †Euomphalus bundtzeni
 †Euomphalus planodorsatus – or unidentified related form
 †Euomphalus planorbis
 †Euomphalus utahensis – or unidentified related form
  †Favosites
 †Favosites emmonsi – or unidentified comparable form
 †Favosites hemispericus
 †Favosites hemisphericus
 †Favosites limitaris
 †Favosites radiciformis
 †Fenestella
 †Fletcheria – tentative report
 †Fusulina
 †Gastrioceras
  †Geragnostus
 †Gervillia
 †Girvanella
 †Gomphoceras
 †Goniatites
 †Grewingkia
 †Gypospirifer
 †Gypospirifer condor
  †Halysites
 †Harpides
 †Harpidium
 †Hedstroemia – tentative report
 †Heliophyllum
 †Hemirhodon
 †Hercynella
  †Hexagonaria
 †Hindeodus
 †Holopea
 †Homagnostus
 †Howittia
 †Icriodus
 †Icriodus angustoides
 †Icriodus taimyricus
 †Idiognathodus
 †Isograptus
 †Isograptus forcipiformis
 †Isograptus manubriatus – or unidentified comparable form
  †Kionoceras
 †Kootenia
 †Kootenia anabarensis – or unidentified comparable form
 †Kootenia granulospinosa – type locality for species
 †Kootenia serrata – or unidentified comparable form
 †Krausella
 †Lejopyge
  †Lejopyge laevigata
 †Lichas
 Lima
 †Lingula
 †Lithostrotion
 †Lithostrotion mclareni
 †Lithostrotion portlocki – or unidentified related form
 †Lithostrotion sinuosum
 †Lithostrotion warreni
 †Lucina
 †Martinia
  †Meristella
 †Meristella barrisi – or unidentified comparable form
 †Meristella ceras – or unidentified comparable form
 †Meristella tumida – tentative report
 †Meristina
 Mesophyllum
 †Michelinoceras – tentative report
 †Microplasma
  †Modiolus – tentative report
  †Monograptus
 †Monograptus acinaces
 †Monograptus atavus
 †Monograptus bohemicus
 †Monograptus buddingtoni
 †Monograptus calamistratus
 †Monograptus clingani – or unidentified related form
 †Monograptus convolutus
 †Monograptus crenularis – or unidentified comparable form
 †Monograptus crinitus
 †Monograptus cyphus
 †Monograptus difformis – or unidentified comparable form
 †Monograptus dubius
 †Monograptus gregarius
 †Monograptus incommodus – or unidentified comparable form
 †Monograptus involutus – or unidentified comparable form
 †Monograptus nilssoni
 †Monograptus noyesensis
 †Monograptus pacificus
 †Monograptus praedubius – or unidentified related form
 †Monograptus priodon
 †Monograptus pseudodubius
 †Monograptus raitzhainesis – or unidentified related form
 †Monograptus revolutus
 †Monograptus scanicus
 †Monograptus tenuis
 †Monograptus thomasi – or unidentified related form
 †Monograptus tumescens
 †Monograptus uncinatus
 †Monograptus undulatus
 †Monograptus varians
 †Monograptus vulgaris – or unidentified comparable form
 †Monograptus yukonensis
 †Morania
  †Mucrospirifer
 †Mucrospirifer refugiensis – type locality for species
 †Murchisonia
  †Naticopsis
 †Naticopsis bowsheri
 †Naticopsis carleyana – or unidentified related form
 †Naticopsis suturicompta
 †Neogondolella
  †Neospirifer
 †Neospirifer cameratus
 †Neospirifer fasciger – or unidentified related form
 †Neospirifer striatus – tentative report
 †Nowakia
  Nucula
 †Nucula shumardiana – or unidentified related form
 †Oncagnostus
 †Oncagnostus tumidosus
 †Oonoceras
 †Orthoceras
 †Orthoceras anguliferas – or unidentified comparable form
 †Oulodus
 †Ozarkodina
 †Ozarkodina confluens
 †Ozarkodina eberleini – type locality for species
 †Ozarkodina paucidentata – or unidentified comparable form
 †Pagetia
 †Panenka
  †Paradoxides
 †Parafusulina – tentative report
  †Pecopteris
 †Pecopteris arborescens
 †Pecopteris hemitelioides
 †Pecopteris unita
 †Pentamerus
 †Peronopsis
 †Phalagnostus
 †Phillipsia
 †Phyllograptus
 †Pinna
 †Platyceras
 †Platycrinites
  Pleurotomaria
  †Polygnathus
 †Polygnathus alexanderensis
 †Polygnathus angusticostatus
 †Polygnathus angustipennatus
 †Polygnathus aspelundi
 †Polygnathus borealis
 †Polygnathus brevis
 †Polygnathus churkini
 †Polygnathus costatus
 †Polygnathus eberleini
 †Polygnathus eiflius
 †Polygnathus inversus
 †Polygnathus kennettensis
 †Polygnathus linguiformis
 †Polygnathus pacificus
 †Polygnathus parawebbi
 †Polygnathus perbonus – or unidentified related form
 †Polygnathus praetrigonicus
 †Polygnathus pseudofoliatus
 †Polygnathus robusticostatus
 †Polygnathus samueli
 †Polygnathus sinuosus
 †Polygnathus trigonicus
 †Polygnathus unicornis
 †Polygnathus xylus
 †Prodentalium
 †Proetus
 †Prohedinia
  †Pseudoamplexus
 †Pseudobornia
 †Pseudobornia ursina
 †Pseudomelania
  †Psilophyton
 †Pteria – report made of unidentified related form or using admittedly obsolete nomenclature
 †Ptychagnostus
 †Pugnax
  †Receptaculites
 †Rhynchonella
 †Rothpletzella
 † Sarcinula
 †Schwagerina
 †Sinutropis
 †Skenidioides
 †Solenopora
 †Solenopora compacta
 †Solenopora filiformis
 † Solenopsis – tentative report
 †Sowerbyella
 †Spathognathodus
 †Sphaerina
 †Sphaerocodium
  †Spirifer
 †Spirifer schellwieni – or unidentified related form
 †Spiriferina
 †Spiriferina panderi – or unidentified related form
 Spirorbis
 †Spyroceras
 †Stringocephalus
 †Strophomena
 †Syringopora
 †Taeniocrada
 †Teganium
  †Tentaculites
 †Tetradium
 †Tetragraptus
  †Triarthrus
 †Uraloceras
 †Uraloceras burtiense
 †Uraloceras fedorowi
 †Uraloceras involutum
 †Uraloceras nevadense
 †Westergaardodina
  †Wodnika
 †Zacanthoides

Mesozoic

Selected Mesozoic taxa of Alaska
This list of the Mesozoic life of Alaska contains the various prehistoric life-forms whose fossilized remains have been reported from within the US state of Alaska and are between 252.17 and 66 million years of age.

 †Actinoceramus
  †Alaskacephale – type locality for genus
 †Alaskacephale gangloffi – type locality for species
 †Amaltheus
 †Amblydactylus
 †Amoeboceras
 Amusium
 †Anagaudryceras
 †Anagaudryceras auranium
 †Anagaudryceras aurarium
 †Anagaudryceras inflatus
 †Anagaudryceras sacya – type locality for species
  †Anapachydiscus
 †Anapachydiscus nelchinensis – type locality for species
 †Anatomites
 †Anomia
  †Arcestes
 †Archaeocidaris – tentative report
 †Arcthoplites
 Arctica – tentative report
  †Arcticoceras
 †Arctocephalites
 †Arctocephalites alticostus
 †Arctocephalites costidensus – type locality for species
 †Arctocephalites pompeckji
 †Arctoceras
 †Arieticeras
 †Arnioceras
 †Arpadites – tentative report
 †Aspenites
 Astarte
 †Asthenoceras
  †Aviculopecten
  †Baculites
 †Belemnites
 †Bradfordia
  †Cadoceras
 †Cadoceras bathomphalum – type locality for species
 †Cadoceras catostoma
 †Cadoceras chinitnense – type locality for species
 †Cadoceras comma – type locality for species
 †Cadoceras crassicostatum – type locality for species
 †Cadoceras doroschini
 †Cadoceras glabrum – type locality for species
 †Cadoceras grewingki
 †Cadoceras kialagvikense – type locality for species
 †Cadoceras petelini
 †Cadoceras schmidti
 †Cadoceras tenuicostatum – type locality for species
 †Cadoceras wosnessenskii
  †Calliphylloceras
 †Calliphylloceras aldersoni – or unidentified comparable form
 †Calliphylloceras freibrocki – type locality for species
 †Calliphylloceras nizinanum – type locality for species
 †Calycoceras
 Capulus – tentative report
 Cardinia
 Cardita – tentative report
 †Cenoceras
 †Ceratites
 Cerithium – tentative report
 Chlamys
 †Chondrites – tentative report
 †Chonetes – tentative report
 Cidaris – tentative report
 †Cimolodon
  Cladophlebis
 †Cladophlebis hirta – tentative report
 †Claraia
 †Claraia stachei
 †Cleoniceras
 †Collonia
 †Corum
 †Cosmonautilus – tentative report
 †Ctenophyllum
 †Cylindroteuthis
  †Dactylioceras
 †Dactylioceras commune – or unidentified comparable form
 †Daonella
 †Daxatina
 †Dentalium
 †Desmoceras
 †Desmophyllites
  †Didymoceras
 †Didymoceras hornbyense – or unidentified related form
 †Docidoceras
 †Docidoceras camachoi – type locality for species
 †Docidoceras longalvum – or unidentified related form
 †Docidoceras paucinodosum – type locality for species
 †Douvilleiceras
 †Dromaeosaurus
 †Dromaeosaurus albertensis
  †Edmontonia
  †Edmontosaurus – or unidentified related form
 †Edmontosaurus saskatchewanensis
 †Ellisonia
 †Epigondolella
 †Euaptetoceras
 †Eubostrychoceras
 †Eudmetoceras
 †Euomphaloceras
 †Euomphalus
 †Fresvillia
 †Gaudryceras
 †Germanonautilus
 †Gervillia
 Ginkgo
  †Ginkgo adiantoides - or unidentified loosely related form
 Gleichenia
  †Gryphaea
 †Gryphaea arcuataeformis
 †Gryphaea arcusta – or unidentified comparable form
 †Gryphaea cymbium – or unidentified comparable form
 †Gryphaea impressimarginata
 †Gryphaea keilhaui – or unidentified comparable form
 †Gryphaea rockymontana
 Guttulina
 †Gymnocodium
 †Hamulus – tentative report
 †Hebetoxyites
  †Hesperornis
 †Heterastridium
 †Hildaites – tentative report
 †Hypophylloceras
  †Inoceramus
 †Inoceramus comancheanus
 †Inoceramus cuvieri – or unidentified comparable form
 †Inoceramus elegans – or unidentified related form
 †Inoceramus eximius
 †Inoceramus hobetsensis – or unidentified related form
 †Inoceramus mamatensis – or unidentified related form
 †Inoceramus naumanni – or unidentified comparable form
 †Inoceramus porrectus – or unidentified comparable form
 †Inoceramus schmidti
 †Inoceramus subundatus – or unidentified comparable form
 †Inoceramus teshioensis – or unidentified related form
 †Inoceramus yokoyamai – or unidentified comparable form
  †Isastrea – tentative report
 Isognomon – tentative report
 †Joannites
  †Kepplerites
 †Kosmoceras
 †Kosmoceras spinosum – or unidentified comparable form
 Lima
 †Lobites
 †Lucina
  †Lytoceras
 †Lytoceras eudesianum – or unidentified related form
 †Lytoceras fimbriatum – or unidentified comparable form
 Margarites
 †Meekoceras
 †Meekoceras gracilitatis
 †Metapolygnathus
 Milax – tentative report
 Milax
 †Modiolus
 †Muramotoceras
 †Murchisonia – tentative report
  †Myophorella
 †Myophorella alaskaensis – type locality for species
 †Myophorella argo
 †Myophorella dawsoni
 †Myophorella devexa
 †Myophorella orientalis
 †Myophorella packardi
 †Myophorella tipperi
 †Myophorella tuxedniensis – type locality for species
 †Myophoria
 †Mytilus
  †Nanuqsaurus – type locality for genus
 †Nanuqsaurus hoglundi – type locality for species
 Natica
 †Neogondolella
 †Neophylloceras
 †Neophylloceras hetonaiense
 †Neophylloceras ramosum
 †Neophylloceras seresitense
 †Neospathodus – report made of unidentified related form or using admittedly obsolete nomenclature
  Nerita – tentative report
 Neritopsis
  Nucula
 †Nucula percrassa – or unidentified related form
 †Ophiceras
 Ostrea
 †Otoscaphites
 †Owenites
 †Owenites koeneni – or unidentified comparable form
 †Oxycerites
 †Oxytoma
  †Pachydiscus
 †Pachydiscus hazzardi – type locality for species
 †Pachydiscus kamishakensis – type locality for species
 †Pachydiscus obsoletiformis – type locality for species
 †Pachydiscus ootacodensis
  †Pachyrhinosaurus
 †Pachyrhinosaurus perotorum – type locality for species
 †Pagiophyllum
 Panopea
 †Parkinsonia – tentative report
 Patella – tentative report
 †Pecten
 †Peregrinella
 Pholadomya
 †Phylloceras
  †Phyllopachyceras
 †Phyllopachyceras chitinanum – type locality for species
 †Phyllopachyceras forbesianum
 †Phyllopachyceras shastalense – or unidentified comparable form
 †Pinna
 † Plagiostoma
 †Planolites – tentative report
  Platanus
 †Platyceras
 †Pleuroacanthites
 †Pleuronautilus
 Pleurotomaria
 Plicatula
 †Posidonia
 †Procerites
 †Protocardia
 †Protrachyceras
  †Pseudomelania – tentative report
 †Pseudotoites
 †Pteria
 †Pterophyllum
 †Puzosia
 †Puzosia alaskana – type locality for species
 †Reineckeites
 †Rhynchonella
  †Sagenopteris – tentative report
 †Saurexallopus
  †Saurornitholestes
 †Saurornitholestes langstoni
 †Saxoceras – tentative report
  †Scaphites
 Scurria – tentative report
 Serpula
 †Sirenites
 Solecurtus – tentative report
 Solemya – tentative report
 †Solenopora
  †Sphenobaiera
 †Sphenobaiera biloba - or unidentified loosely related form
 †Sphenobaiera czekanowskiana - or unidentified loosely related form
 †Sphenobaiera longifolia - or unidentified loosely related form
 †Spiriferina
 †Spiriferina borealis – tentative report
 †Spiriferina yukonensis – type locality for species
 †Spirocyclina – tentative report
  Spondylus – tentative report
 Terebratula
 Teredolites
 †Thamnasteria
 Thracia
 †Trichites – report made of unidentified related form or using admittedly obsolete nomenclature
 †Trigonia
 Trochus
 †Troodon
 †Troodon formosus
 Turbo – tentative report
 Turritella – tentative report
 †Tutcheria
  †Ugrunaaluk – type locality for genus
 †Ugrunaaluk kuukpikensis – type locality for species
 †Vermiceras
 †Worthenia
 †Wyomingites
 †Xenoceltites
 †Xenoceltites cordilleranus
 †Xenocephalites
 †Xenocephalites hartsocki – type locality for species
 †Xenocephalites vicarius – type locality for species
 †Yezoites
 †Zetoceras

Cenozoic

Selected Cenozoic taxa of Alaska
This list of the Cenozoic life of Alaska contains the various prehistoric life-forms whose fossilized remains have been reported from within the US state of Alaska and are between 66 million and 10,000 years of age.

 Acanthocardia
 Acirsa
 Acmaea
 Agonum
 †Ainus
  Alces
 Alnus
 Alopex
 †Alopex lagopus
 Alvania
 Amara
 Amauropsis
 Ancistrolepis
 Angulus
 †Anomalosipho – tentative report
 Anomia – tentative report
 Aphaenogaster
 Arca
 Arctica
  †Arctodus
 †Arctodus simus
 Argobuccinum
  †Arktocara – type locality for genus
 †Arktocara yakataga – type locality for species
 Asaphidion
 Asinus
 Astarte
 †Astarte borealis
 Astrangia
 †Aturia
 Balanus
 †Balanus balanoides
 †Balanus balanus
  †Balanus crenatus
 †Balanus nubilus – or unidentified comparable form
 Bembidion
 Beringius
 †Beringius crebricostatus
 Betula
 Bibio
 Bison
  †Bison priscus
 †Bootherium
  †Bootherium bombifrons
 Boreotrophon
 †Boreotrophon rotundatus – or unidentified comparable form
 Brachidontes
 †Branchioplax
 †Branchioplax washingtoniana
 Buccella
 Buccinum
 †Buccinum angulosum
 †Buccinum glaciale
 Bulbus
 †Bulbus fragilis
 Cadulus
 Calliostoma
 Callorhinus
  †Callorhinus ursinus
 Calyptraea
 Camponotus
 Cancellaria
 Canis
  †Canis lupus
 Carabus
 †Carabus nemoralis – or unidentified comparable form
 †Carabus truncaticollis – or unidentified comparable form
 †Carex
 Caryophyllia
 Cassidulina
 Castalia
 Castanea
 Cepheus
  †Cervalces
 Cervus
 †Cervus elaphus
 Ceutorhynchus – tentative report
 Chama
 Chione
 Chlamys
  †Chlamys islandica
 †Chlamys rubida
 †Chrysodomus – tentative report
 Chrysolina
 Cibicides
 Cingula
  Clinocardium
 †Clinocardium nuttallii
 Colus
 Corbicula
 Corbula
 †Cornwallius
 †Corylus
 Crenella
 Crepidula
 Cryptonatica
 †Cryptonatica affinis
 Cyclocardia
 Cylichna
 Cyperus
  Delphinapterus – tentative report
 Dentalium
  †Desmatophoca – tentative report
 Diacheila
 Dicrostonyx
 Dioon
 Dyschirius
 Echinarachnius
 Echinophoria
 Elphidium
 Enhydra
 Enicmus
 †Epipremnum
  Epitonium
 Equus
 †Equus alaskae
 Erignathus
  †Erignathus barbatus
 Erigone
  Eschrichtius
 Eumetopias
 †Eumorphocorystes
 Euspira
 †Euspira pallida
 Evalea
 †Exilia – tentative report
  †Flabellaria
 Fulgoraria
 Gari
 Georissus
 Globigerina
 †Globigerina bulloides – or unidentified related form
 Glycymeris
 Helophorus
 Hiatella
 †Hiatella arctica
 Hinnites – tentative report
 Histriophoca
  †Histriophoca fasciata
 Homalopoma – tentative report
 †Hydrodamalis
  †Hydrodamalis gigas
 Isurus
 †Kolponomos – or unidentified comparable form
 Lasiopodomys
 Lathrobium
 Laurus
 Leistus
 Lemmus
 †Lemmus sibiricus
 Leptothorax
 Leukoma
 Limatula
 Liocyma
 †Liocyma fluctuosa
 Liomesus
  Littorina
 †Lora
  Lunatia
 Lyonsia
 Macoma
 †Macoma balthica – or unidentified related form
 Macrocallista – tentative report
  Magnolia
  †Mammut
 †Mammuthus
  †Mammuthus primigenius
 Margarites
 Marmota
 Martesia – tentative report
 Mathilda
 Messor
 †Metacarcinus
 Micropeplus
 Microtus
 Modiolus
 Musculus
 †Musculus niger
 †Mya
 †Mya arenaria – or unidentified comparable form
 †Mya truncata
  Myrica
 Mytilus
 †Mytilus edulis
 Natica
 Nebria
 Neoconorbina
 Neptunea
 †Neptunea heros
 †Neptunea lyrata
 †Neptunea ventricosa
 Neverita
  Notiophilus
 Nucula
 Ochotona
 †Ochotona whartoni
 Odobenus
  †Odobenus rosmarus
 Oenopota
 †Oenopota candida
 †Osmunda
 Ostrea
 Ovibos
  †Ovibos moschatus
  Ovis
 †Ovis dalli – tentative report
 †Oxytoma
 Pagophilus
 Palliolum
 Pandora
 Papyridea
 Patrobus
 †Perse
 Phenacomys
 Phoca
 †Phoca hispida
  †Phoca vitulina
 Picea
 †Picea glauca
 †Picea mariana
 †Picea sitchensis – or unidentified comparable form
 Pinus
  †Pinus monticola
 Pitar
 †Planera
 Plicifusus
 †Pododesmus macrochisma
 Polinices
  Populus
 Portlandia
 †Portunites
 †Predicrostonyx
 †Predicrostonyx hopkinsi
 †Protocardia – tentative report
 †Protochelydra
 †Protochelydra zangerli – or unidentified comparable form
 Protothaca
 Pteris
 Pterostichus
 Puncturella
 †Puncturella longifissa
 Purpura
 Pusa – or unidentified related form
 †Pusa hispida
 Pyrgo
 Pyrulofusus
 Quercus
 Quinqueloculina
 Rangifer
  †Rangifer tarandus
 Rhabdus
 Rosalina
 †Rotalia
  Saiga
 Saxidomus
 Scaphander
 †Scaphander lignarius – or unidentified comparable form
 †Scutella
 Sequoia
 Serripes
 †Serripes groenlandicus
 Siliqua
  Siphonalia
 Sorex
 Spermophilus
 †Spermophilus undulatus
 Spirorbis
 Spirotropis
 Spisula
 Stenus
 Strongylocentrotus
  †Strongylocentrotus droebachiensis
 †Symphoricarpos
 Tachyrhynchus
 †Tachyrhynchus erosus
 Taxodium
  †Taxodium distichum
 Tellina
 Terebratula
 Thracia
 Thyasira
 Tonicella
 Trichotropis
 †Trichotropis bicarinata
 †Tsuga
 †Tsuga heterophylla
 Turritella
 Ulmus
 Ursus
  †Vaccinium
 Venericardia
 Vitis
 Volutopsius
 Vulpes
  †Vulpes vulpes
 Xysticus
 Yoldia

References

 

Alaska
Alaska-related lists